John R. Cameron (1875–1944) was a Scottish footballer who played in the Football League for West Bromwich Albion.

References

1875 births
1944 deaths
Scottish footballers
English Football League players
Association football forwards
West Bromwich Albion F.C. players
Blackburn Rovers F.C. players
Footballers from Edinburgh